The Blees is a river flowing through Luxembourg, joining the Sauer at Bleesbruck.  It flows through the towns of Hosingen, Brandenbourg, and Bastendorf.

Rivers of the Ardennes (Luxembourg)
Rivers of Luxembourg
Bettendorf, Luxembourg
Hosingen